The Ayrshire Apartments is a historic building located in Des Moines, Iowa, United States.  It was built in 1920 as a fireproof apartment hotel.  The three-story building was designed in the Tudor Revival style, represented by the half-timbering on the third floor.  All 36 units include a kitchenette, a Murphy bed in the living room, and a built-in clothes closet.  The end units on each floor are larger than the interior units and they include a solarium.  The building is located on Sixth Avenue, which by the turn of the 20th century had become a major route utilized by vehicular traffic and streetcar lines.  Its proximity to this transportation corridor illustrates the emergence of higher and denser residential use in these areas of Des Moines.  The apartment building was listed on the National Register of Historic Places in 1996 as a part of the Towards a Greater Des Moines MPS.

References

Residential buildings completed in 1920
National Register of Historic Places in Des Moines, Iowa
Apartment buildings on the National Register of Historic Places in Iowa
Apartment buildings in Des Moines, Iowa
Tudor Revival architecture in Iowa
1920 establishments in Iowa